A big bang engine is an unconventional engine designed so that some of the power strokes occur simultaneously or in close succession. This is achieved by changing the ignition timing, changing or re-timing the camshaft, and sometimes in combination with a change in crankpin angle. The goal is to change the power delivery characteristics of the engine. A regular firing multi-cylinder engine fires at approximately even intervals, giving a smooth-running engine. Because a big-bang engine has uneven power delivery, they tend to run rougher and generate more vibration than an even-firing engine.

Twin-cylinder engines

Parallel twins

The classic British parallel-twins (BSA, Triumph, Norton, AJS & Matchless) all had 360° crankshafts that, compared to a single, gave twice as many ignition pulses which were evenly spaced.  However, the 360 twin had a mechanical primary engine balance that was no better than a single.

By contrast, Japanese parallel twins of the 1960s (such as the 1966 Honda “Black Bomber” and the Yamaha TX500) adopted a 180° crank that afforded perfect mechanical primary engine balance.  However, the 180° crank yielded some "tingling" secondary vibration (which could be minimised with a balance shaft), and an uneven firing order.

The Yamaha TRX850 pioneered the use of a 270° crank. This configuration allowed a firing pattern more regular than a 180° crank, and less regular than a 360° crank. A 270° crank gives the best possible secondary engine balance for a parallel twin, and its exhaust note and power delivery resembles those of a 90° V-twin.

Twingles

A "twingle" is a four-stroke twin-cylinder engine with an altered firing order designed to give power pulses similar to a single-cylinder four-stroke engine.

Inline twins with a 360° crankpin offset or flat-twins can be easily converted into twingles by firing both of the cylinders at the same time and installing a camshaft or camshafts that operate both cylinders' valves in parallel. Because many such engines already employ the wasted spark principle, only the camshaft modification is necessary. The Vintage Dirt Track Racing Association (VDTRA) 2010 Rules have banned vintage motorcycles from being set up as a twingle.

V twins

A narrow angle V-twin such as the 45° Harley-Davidson naturally has slightly unevenly spaced power strokes. By changing the ignition timing on one of the cylinders by 360° the power strokes are very closely spaced. This will cause uneven fuel distribution in an engine with a single carburettor. The Harley-Davidson XR-750 with twin carburettors was a popular bike to twingle. It had great success in flattrack racing.

Three-cylinder engines

A straight-three engine is most often equipped with a 120° crankshaft that fires evenly every 240°. The Laverda Jota 180, produced between 1973 and 1981, was the first motorcycle to use a different kind of crankshaft. In the Jota, a "flat-plane" crankshaft was used which has cylinders 1 and 3 offset by 360° while the second one is offset by 180° from the outer cylinders.

Triumph Motorcycles Ltd is another company that used a different firing order on an inline-three and introduced a "T-plane" crankshaft on the 2020 Tiger 900. In this case, cylinders 1 and 2 are offset by 90° and cylinders 2 and 3 are offset by at 90°, resulting in the crank pin arrangement resembling the letter T. Triumph claims improved low-end character, off-road feel, and a unique sound.

Four-cylinder engines

Note that typical two-stroke V4s have four crank throws or pins (see below) so it is important to stipulate all four crank pin phases with the two-stroke engines. The "split" in this case is referring to the difference in phase between piston pairs in "opposite" banks that would normally share a crank pin in a four-stroke engine.

The Ford V4s use split-pin crankshafts, like many 60° V6s. Just as with a boxer-four, piston pairs from opposite banks reach top-dead-centre at the same time, but with a crankpin split of only 60° instead of 180°, potentially giving a shorter and stronger or stiffer crankshaft.  For 60° V6s, the crankpins are usually split the other way causing the paired pistons to reach top-dead-centre 120° apart.

Inline fours

As with many even-firing engines with four or more cylinders, an even-firing four-cylinder engine is sometimes referred to as a "Screamer". A "long bang" inline 4 engine fires both pairs of cylinders in quick succession or simultaneously; the power delivery is identical to a parallel twin with a 180° crank and similar to a V-twin. In 2005 Kawasaki experimented with this configuration on the ZX-RR MotoGP bike.

2-stroke V4

Typical two-stroke V4s have four crank throws, or crank pins, instead of the two that most four-stroke V4s have (two connecting rods sharing each pin).  This is primarily because each piston needed its own sealed crankcase volume for the purposes of efficient induction, where in some cases separate crankshafts served each bank in order to achieve this.

The Honda NSR500 began and ended its life as a "screamer", where the pistons were phased similarly to a four-stroke V-four with a 180° crank. However, in 1990 Honda set the crankpin phases of each pair of pistons within each bank to be the same (like a four-stroke "droner": 360° crank), but with each bank's crankpins offset by 180° to each other (effectively "splitting" the pins and changing the V-angle, in terms of ignition timing). This was called a "big bang" engine.

Yamaha created a big bang YZR500 in 1992. The YZR500 had two crankshafts like a U engine and the angle between each pair of cylinders was 90°, like a V4.

In 1997 Mick Doohan wanted to run a 180° screamer engine. HRC crew chief Jerry Burgess explained "The 180 got back a direct relationship between the throttle and the rear wheel, When the tire spun I could roll off without losing drive. The big bang has a lot of engine braking, so it upsets the bike into corners, then when you open the throttle you get this sudden pulse of power, which again upsets the suspension. Mick's secret is corner speed, so he needs the bike to be smooth and the 180 is much smoother."

Five-cylinder engines

Six-cylinder engines

References

Crankshafts
Motorcycle engines
Engine technology